Alexander Patterson Gilligan (1872 – 1952) was a Scottish footballer who played in the Scottish Football League for Dundee (being among the first players to play for the club following its formation in 1893, and the scorer of the first league goal) and in the English Football League for Bolton Wanderers.

He was the eldest of four brothers who were professional footballers, the others being Billy, Sam and John.

References

1872 births
1952 deaths
Scottish footballers
Scottish Junior Football Association players
Scottish Football League players
English Football League players
Association football forwards
Dundee F.C. players
Bolton Wanderers F.C. players
East Craigie F.C. players
Footballers from Dundee
Scottish people of Irish descent
Dundee East End F.C. players